Balena is a former settlement in the Fortune Bay District of the Canadian province of Newfoundland and Labrador.

Coastal ferries operated by the Reid-Newfoundland Company and the Newfoundland Produce Company made frequent calls there around 1911.

The first Postmaster was A.D. Neilson.

See also
List of ghost towns in Newfoundland and Labrador

References 

Ghost towns in Newfoundland and Labrador